John Buck (1893), titled Skanawati among other variants, was a leader of the Onondaga who lived near Ontario's Grand River. He was the official keeper of the wampum records of the Iroquois, sometimes described as a firekeeper. He took on the role of wampum keeper in 1843. Buck was described in a contemporary account as "a capable ruler and an able and trustworthy negotiator". Kenyon and Kenyon identify him as a "follower of Handsome Lake".

Biography 

John Buck was born . He was described in an obituary as being descended from "ancient Iroquois nobility". Buck took on the role of wampum keeper in 1843. As the official keeper of the wampum records of the Iroquois, he was described as being a "conservative" leader who followed the traditional customs of his people closely. Although Buck did not speak the language, he gave lengthy interviews with English-speaking historians in an effort to preserve the Iroquois's culture. Scholars such as J. N. B. Hewitt drew on Buck's knowledge of his people's history.

In June 1887, Buck and several other members of the Iroquois petitioned the Canadian government to repeal portions of the Franchise Act, which had offered tribes including the Onondaga the right to vote. He was friends with Horatio Hale. Frank Speck purchased Buck's ritual mask collection. He died in 1893, aged approximately 75. Buck's children sold wampum belts that he had held.

Notes

Sources

Further reading

External links 
 

1893 deaths
Onondaga people
Tutelo